The subthreshold slope is a feature of a MOSFET's current–voltage characteristic.

In the subthreshold region, the drain current behaviour  –  though being controlled by the gate terminal – is similar to the exponentially decreasing current of a forward biased diode.  Therefore a plot of drain current versus gate voltage with drain, source, and bulk voltages fixed will exhibit approximately log linear behaviour in this MOSFET operating regime. Its slope is the subthreshold slope.

The subthreshold slope is also the  reciprocal value of the subthreshold swing Ss-th which is usually given as:

 = depletion layer capacitance

 = gate-oxide capacitance

 =  thermal voltage

A typical experimental subthreshold swing for a scaled MOSFET at room temperature is ~70 mV/dec, slightly degraded due to short-channel MOSFET parasitics.

A dec (decade) corresponds to a 10 times increase of the drain current ID.

A device characterized by steep subthreshold slope exhibits a faster transition between off (low current) and on (high current) states.

References

External links
 Optimization of Ultra-Low-Power CMOS Transistors; Michael Stockinger, 2000

Transistor modeling